This is a list of members of the Victorian Legislative Assembly from 1952 to 1955, as elected at the 1952 state election.

Two party splits took place during the period: 
 In August 1953, several Liberal members were expelled for supporting former Liberal Premier Thomas Hollway, who had formed an "Electoral Reform League" grouping in the Parliament advocating two Assembly seats for every Federal seat in Victoria and had, at the 1952 election, defeated the Liberal leader Les Norman in his own seat. With his electoral reform plans implemented by the Cain government, Hollway changed the name of the party to the Victorian Liberal Party in October 1954 (not to be confused with the extant Liberal and Country Party, the Victorian division of the federal Liberal Party).
 In 1955 during the Hobart conference of the governing Labor Party, the mostly Catholic supporters of the Industrial Groups and B. A. Santamaria either resigned from the party or were expelled and formed the Australian Labor Party (Anti-Communist), which ultimately became the Democratic Labor Party (DLP).

Both groups lost almost their entire parliamentary representation at the 1955 state election which followed, although the DLP continued to be a significant source of Liberal preferences until the early 1970s.

  On 2 May 1953, the Opposition Leader and Liberal member for Malvern, Trevor Oldham, died. Liberal candidate John Bloomfield won the resulting by-election on 11 July 1953.

Sources
 Re-member (a database of all Victorian MPs since 1851). Parliament of Victoria.

Members of the Parliament of Victoria by term
20th-century Australian politicians